Mariestad Municipality (Mariestads kommun) is a municipality in Västra Götaland County in western Sweden. Its seat is located in the city of Mariestad.

The present municipality was formed in 1971, when the City of Mariestad was amalgamated with four surrounding rural municipalities.

Geography
Mariestad Municipality is situated on Lake Vänern and is visited by many tourists in summer. The largest fresh water archipelago in Sweden lies within the municipality. Torsö and Brommö are the two largest islands. North of the city, in Sjötorp, Göta Canal meets Lake Vänern.

Localities
Population centers in the municipality include:
 Lugnås
 Lyrestad
 Mariestad (seat)
 Sjötorp
 Ullervad

Industry
The largest employers are Electrolux home products and Katrinefors bruk, a part of Metsä Tissue AB. SCA Packaging AB, RM Perfo AB and Jede AB are other notable companies in Mariestad. Within the IT industry Telia Partner AB and WM-data Infra Solutions AB are the two biggest employers. Just south of Mariestad, in Lugnås, you find Nimbus Produktion AB who manufactures Nimbus boats.

International relations

Twin towns — sister cities
Mariestad Municipality is twinned with:
 Pakruojis, Lithuania

References

Corresponding article on Swedish Wikipedia

External links

Mariestad Municipality - Official site

Municipalities of Västra Götaland County
Skaraborg